La Fédération Européenne des Réalisateurs de l'Audiovisuel (FERA) (Federation of European FIlm Directors in English) represents the interests of film and television directors in the European motion picture industry.

FERA speaks on behalf of professional film and television directors at the European level on issues of major importance in the creation and promotion of audiovisual works. The director is the creative decision maker in a process of artistic collaboration and takes final responsibility for the aesthetic cohesion and artistic integrity of the work.  FERA is committed to safeguarding the craft, artistry and the creative and economic rights of the director as essential components to the diversity of audiovisual culture in Europe and beyond.

FERA is based in Brussels, Belgium and celebrated its 40th anniversary in 2020.

FERA